is a Japanese ice hockey player for DK Perigrine and the Japanese national team. She participated at the 2015 IIHF Women's World Championship.

Taka competed at the 2018 Winter Olympics.

References

External links

1996 births
Living people
Ice hockey players at the 2018 Winter Olympics
Ice hockey players at the 2022 Winter Olympics
Japanese women's ice hockey forwards
Olympic ice hockey players of Japan
Sportspeople from Hokkaido
Competitors at the 2017 Winter Universiade